Lewis Gribben is a Scottish actor from Glasgow. He had the lead role in the 2022 British drama series Somewhere Boy shown on Channel 4 and subsequently won a Screen Daily rising star award.

Career
Gribben was born and raised in Glasgow. An only child, his mother started taking him to the Glasgow Citizens Theatre aged seven to help him interact more with other children. Diagnosed with autism and dyslexia, Gribben told The Scotsman that he has some life experience that helped him play the role of Danny in Channel 4 and Clerkenwell Films 2022 drama Somewhere Boy, about a teenage boy who on his fathers death learns he has been given a distorted view of life since infancy. As a teenager Gribben acted with a company called the  Attic Collective before attending Glasgow Clyde College for two years and then graduating in 2019 with a BA Hons Acting for Stage and Screen from Queen Margaret University in Edinburgh. A succession of small roles followed in films such as T2 Trainspotting, Get Duked!, and television series such as Silent Witness, Deadwater Fell and Shetland, before he landed the lead role in Somewhere Boy. Following the success of Somewhere Boy he was named Screen Daily Rising Star 2022. Gribben has up-coming roles in Masters of the Air for Apple TV and Chemistry of Death for Paramount+.

Personal life
Gribben still lives in Glasgow, he told The Guardian in 2022 “Every time I do anything in Scotland, they just say: ‘Are you ever gonna come down to London?’ Absolutely not”.

Filmography

Film

External links

References

Scottish male film actors
Living people
Scottish actors
People from Glasgow
Actors with autism
People with dyslexia
Year of birth missing (living people)